Juan Carlos Blanco (born July 27, 1981) is a volleyball setter from Venezuela, who won the gold medal with the men's national team at the 2003 Pan American Games in Santo Domingo, Dominican Republic. In the final his team defeated Cuba 3–0 (25–23, 25–18, 25–20).

He won with his team the gold medal at the 2005 Bolivarian Games.

Awards

National Team

Senior Team
 2005 Bolivarian Games, -  Gold Medal

References

External links
 FIVB Profile

1981 births
Living people
Venezuelan men's volleyball players
Volleyball players at the 2008 Summer Olympics
Olympic volleyball players of Venezuela
Volleyball players at the 2003 Pan American Games
Volleyball players at the 2007 Pan American Games
Pan American Games gold medalists for Venezuela
Venezuelan expatriate sportspeople in Romania
People from Guatire
Pan American Games medalists in volleyball
Medalists at the 2003 Pan American Games